Tut (also Romanized as Tūt; also known as Tūt-e Gūrkash) is a village in Dorud Rural District, in the Central District of Dorud County, Lorestan Province, Iran. At the 2006 census, its population was 288, in 59 families.

References 

Towns and villages in Dorud County